Leni Zumas is an American writer from Washington, D.C., who lives in Oregon. She is the author of Red Clocks, The Listeners and the story collection Farewell Navigator. Her short fiction, essays, and interviews have appeared in BOMB, The Cut, Granta, Guernica, Portland Monthly, The Times Literary Supplement, The Sunday Times Style (UK), Tin House, and elsewhere. She teaches creative writing at Portland State University.

Career
Zumas majored in English at Brown University and earned an MFA in Creative Writing from the University of Massachusetts Amherst. Before joining the English faculty at Portland State University, she taught writing at Columbia University, Hunter College, Eugene Lang College, the University of Massachusetts Amherst, and the Juniper Summer Writing Institute.

Her second novel, Red Clocks (Little, Brown, 2018), was a national bestseller and winner of the Oregon Book Award in Fiction. It was shortlisted for the Orwell Prize for Political Fiction and the Neukom Institute Literary Arts Award for Speculative Fiction. Naomi Alderman's review in The New York Times calls the novel "a lyrical and beautifully observed reflection on women's lives"; Ploughshares describes it as "a reckoning, a warning, and nothing short of a miracle"; and Maggie Nelson has said, "Red Clocks is funny, mordant, baroque, political, poetic, alarming, and inspiring—not to mention a way forward for fiction now." Cleveland Review of Books said that the questions the book poses are the questions that Americans are asking today, as we look to a future where Roe v. Wade could be overturned.

Red Clocks was a New York Times Book Review Editors' Choice, an Amazon Best Book of the Month, and an IndieBound Indie Next pick. It was named a Best Book of 2018 by The Atlantic, The Washington Post, The Huffington Post, Entropy, and the New York Public Library. Vulture voted it one of the 100 Most Important Books of the 21st Century So Far. Red Clocks was published in the UK by The Borough Press/HarperCollins and has been translated into eight languages.

Zumas's first novel, The Listeners (Tin House, 2012), was a finalist for the Oregon Book Award and was selected by Powell's Books for its Indiespensable First Edition Club.

Farewell Navigator: Stories was published in 2008 by Open City. "If darkness has ever been your friend, your story is in here," said Miranda July of the collection. A review in L.A. Weekly observed: "It's a rare writer who can bring us closer to people we might cross the street to avoid."

Publications

Books
Farewell Navigator. Open City, 2008. 
The Listeners. Tin House, 2012. 
Red Clocks. Little, Brown, 2018.

Recent short works

 "Navigable Waters." Greenpeace.org.
 "Letters to Mothers: Crones, Hags, Witches, and Killjoys." with Sophia Shalmiyev, Guernica, 2019.

"That." Granta, 2018.
"The Moraine." Portland Monthly, 2018.
"She Was Warned." Tin House, 2017.
"Voss, Bree, Fend, Light." The Elephants, 2017.

References

External links 
 Official website

Living people
American women short story writers
American women novelists
Brown University alumni
University of Massachusetts Amherst MFA Program for Poets & Writers alumni
Portland State University faculty
21st-century American women writers
21st-century American novelists
21st-century American short story writers
Novelists from Oregon
Novelists from Washington, D.C.
Year of birth missing (living people)
American women academics